The Bird Wing or later, Bird Wing Imperial was a light sport biplane of the 1920s and 1930s.

Development
The first Bird Wing took McCrum and his assistants 63 days to build at a cost of US$12,000. The prototype flew over 5000 passengers over a period of  15 months. McCrum revised the plans for the Bird Wing again in the 1950s to install a  Pratt & Whitney R-985 Wasp Junior radial engine and a 3 inch fuselage widening to convert the design into an agricultural aircraft which never went into production.

Design
The biplane features welded steel tube fuselage with aircraft fabric covering and spruce wood spar wings.

Operational history
Among the many pilots who flew the Bird Wing were Hap Arnold and Charles Lindbergh. McCrum offered comprehensive flight training courses which included flight training in a Bird Wing as well as construction of the aircraft from scratch. The Bird Wing Imperial was tested to meet a 1931 requirement for a United States PT trainer. 50 orders were placed, then canceled at the beginning of the Great Depression.

Variants
Bird Wing No. 2 - Upper and lower ailerons
Bird Wing No. 4 -  Hisso powered
Bird Wing Imperial - 1930  Wright Whirlwind R-540 powered. Max speed

Specifications (Bird Wing Model 1)

References

1910s United States sport aircraft
Biplanes
Aircraft first flown in 1927
Single-engined tractor aircraft
Conventional landing gear